Arria was a 1st-century Roman woman who committed suicide.

Arria may also refer to:

 Arria (mantis), a genus of insects in the family Haaniidae
 Arria gens, an ancient Roman family
 Arria NLG, a UK-based artificial intelligence company
 Diego Arria (born 1938), Venezuelan diplomat and politician
 Arria, a family of field-programmable gate arrays from Altera (now Intel)

See also
Aria (disambiguation)